The 2016 Tampa Bay Rowdies season was the club's sixth NASL season, and seventh season overall since their formation in 2008. It was also their final season in the NASL, as the team switched leagues to the USL after the season ended.

Roster

On loan

Staff
  Perry Van der Beck – Assistant General Manager/Vice President of Community Relations
  Stuart Campbell – Head Coach
  Raoul Voss – Assistant Coach
  Stuart Dobson – Goalkeeper Coach
  Jason Riley – Strength & Conditioning Coach
  Malcolm Phillips – Equipment Manager
  Dr. Koco Eaton – Team Physician/Orthopedic Surgeon
  Dr. Sanjay Menon – Team Physician/Orthopedic Surgeon
  Dr. Christopher Salud – Team Physician
  Andrew Keane – Head Athletic Trainer
  Laura Tllinghast Hine – Yoga Instructor
  Dr. Samuel Meyers – Team Chiropractor

Transfers

Winter/Spring

In:

Out:

Summer/Fall

In:

Out:

Friendlies

Competitions

NASL Spring season

Standings

Results summary

Results by round

Matches

NASL Fall season

Standings

Results summary

Results by round

Matches

U.S. Open Cup 

Tampa Bay Rowdies will compete in the 2016 edition of the Open Cup.

Squad statistics

Appearances and goals

|-
|colspan="14"|Players who appeared for the Tampa Bay Rowdies who left the club during the season:
|}

Goal scorers

Disciplinary record

Honors

Individual honors
NASL Best XI
 Joe Cole

References

External links
Official website

Tampa Bay Rowdies
Tampa Bay Rowdies (2010–) seasons
Tampa Bay Rowdies
Tampa Bay Rowdies
Sports in St. Petersburg, Florida